Major-General Sir Archibald Paris,  (9 November 1861 – 30 October 1937) was a Royal Marine officer who commanded the Royal Naval Division in the First World War. His son, Brigadier Archibald Paris, served in the Second World War in Malaya.

Military career
Paris was commissioned a lieutenant in the Royal Marine Artillery on 1 September 1879, promoted to captain on 7 May 1890, and to major on 18 August 1898. He served as an artillery officer to the Rhodesian Field Force in South Africa during the Second Boer War, and received a brevet promotion to lieutenant colonel in the South African Honours list published on 26 June 1902. Following the end of the war, in late May 1902, he continued on special service in South Africa, but he returned to the United Kingdom on the SS Syria two months later, arriving in Southampton in early September 1902.

Paris commanded the Naval Division from its concentration in Antwerp and he was seen to have preserved the particular identity and character of the Division while it fought alongside the Army. He was promoted from colonel second commandant to major general, in recognition of his services in the field, on 16 October 1915. He was appointed a Knight Commander of the Order of the Bath (KCB) in the 1916 New Year Honours. While in Belgium on 20 June 1917, he was wounded in the shoulder, the back and he lost his left leg and consequently had to relinquish his command. He retired from the military on account of his wounds in July 1917. 

For his war service, Paris was made a Commander of the Belgian Order of Leopold (with Swords), awarded the Belgian Croix de guerre and the French Croix de Guerre.

Paris died on 30 October 1937. He had a son, Archibald Paris, who served in the British Army, briefly commanding the Indian 11th Division during the Battle of Malaya.

References

1861 births
1937 deaths
Royal Marines generals
Knights Commander of the Order of the Bath
Recipients of the Croix de guerre (Belgium)
Recipients of the Croix de Guerre 1914–1918 (France)
Royal Marines generals of World War I
British military personnel of the Second Boer War